(often abbreviated to  or , and seen on coins as  or ) is a Latin title meaning By the Grace of God, Queen. The male equivalent is  meaning By the Grace of God, King.

This phrase is circumscribed on the obverse of many British and Canadian coins. The phrase, or some variation of it, has also been used on past coinage issued in Australia, Austria, Cyprus, Spain, and Sweden. In addition to coinage, the phrase is also used on the obverse side of some medals in the Commonwealth realms.

History

Australia

With the introduction of decimal coinage in 1966, the phrase was formally dropped.

Austria

Pre-1918 coins of the Austrian Empire that showed the bust of the emperor or empress included the initials , for the Latin .

Canada
Canadian coins struck during Queen Victoria's reign read .

The  portion was removed temporarily from Canadian coinage in 1911 and led to such a public uproar over the "godless" coins that it was returned to Canadian coinage in the subsequent year. 

From 1948 to 1952, still under George VI, after the independence of India, they read .

However, some commemorative coins issued under Elizabeth II do not include the phrase  or its abbreviated version. Canadian coins that do not have the phrase on its obverse include 1976 Montreal Olympics, 25¢ coins for the 2010 Vancouver Olympics, (but not the $1 coin issued for the same games), the 2001 10¢ coin commemorating volunteers, the 1982 $1 coin commemorating the patriation of the constitution, the 1984 Jacques Cartier commemorative dollar coin, the $2 coin issued in 2008 commemorating the 400th anniversary of Quebec City, and the 2012 $2 coin commemorating the War of 1812.

Cyprus

Cyprus, while under British rule, included the phrase  (or ) in some form on its coins until 1952.  It was dropped after Queen Elizabeth II acceded to the throne in 1952, when the language of the legend was changed from Latin to English.

Jersey

The Bailiwick of Jersey included the phrase  (or )  in some form on its coins until 1952.  It was dropped after Queen Elizabeth II acceded to the throne in 1952.

Spain
Many Spanish coins prior to 1937 included the Spanish phrase .  Those coins issued after 1937 under Franco that had his image included the phrase .  With the resumption of democracy under a constitutional monarchy after 1975 the phrase was dropped from Spanish coins.

Sweden
Although some Swedish coins continue to bear the bust of the monarch, the phrase is no longer on the coins.

United Kingdom

United Kingdom coins have for some time included the phrase  (or /  or some form of it). When Elizabeth II ascended to the throne, coins of the pound sterling initially had the phrase  (by the Grace of God, of all the Britains Queen, Defender of the Faith), or some form abbreviated form of the phrase.  was later dropped from the phrase in 1954, with no reference to any realm made on coins issued after that year. 

See also
 Style of the British sovereign
 Style of the Canadian sovereign
 Style of the Dutch sovereign
 Style of the French sovereign
 Style of the Portuguese sovereign

References

Latin mottos
Coins